Juan Astorquia Landabaso (June 1876 - 23 October 1905), also known as Juanito Astorquia, was a Spanish footballer who played as a forward for Athletic Club. He is widely regarded as one of the most important figures in the amateur beginnings of Athletic Club from Bilbao, having been the fundamental head behind the foundation of the club in 1898 and its official establishment in 1901, and then serving as the club's first president and captain between 1902 and 1904.

Under Astorquia's leadership, Athletic Club became a dominant team on the national level, captaining the Basque club to triumphs at the 1902 Copa de la Coronación and 1903 Copa del Rey, which were the club's first pieces of silverware. A lover of sports, he was also a fan of velocipedism.

Footballing career

Foundation of Athletic
Being the son of a well-off family in Bilbao, he was sent to Britain to complete his studies, doing so in a Catholic college in Manchester. While in Manchester, he developed an interest in football, becoming one of the best football players in his school, having great skill in dominating the ball and in dribbles, two virtues that were highly regarded in a time when kicking reigned. Astorquia was 20 when he returned to Bilbao and like many other Balbainos, he began to play football games in the Hippodrome of Lamiako, which at the time was the home of organized football in Biscay. In 1898, together with six other Basque football enthusiasts, students who had also studied in England and Lamiako usuals belonging to the Gimnásio Zamacois, decides to open a practice center in Lamiako, and after some recruitment work from the seven, they began to arrange and organise matches of the game they loved games with British workers. Astorquia was the figurehead of the seven-man committee that founded Bilbao’s first (unofficial) football club. This group of football pioneers would later become Athletic Club.

Although they were founded in 1898, it was not until February 1901, in a meeting held at the Café García, that Astorquia's group, now larger, began conversations to officially established a football club, so a commission made up of Juan Astorquia, Enrique Goiri, and José Maria Barquín was formed with the intention of preparing regulations for a football society, and this regulation was approved on 11 June. The entity's Board was subsequently elected, with Juan Astorquia being appointed the team's captain, while Alfred Mills, the only foreigner to be part of the board, was named the vice-captain. Since the figure of coach as we know it today did not exist at the time, it was Astorquia and Mills, as captain of the clubs, who was in charge of making up the line-ups and dictating the tactics to be followed. The most logical name for a new football club founded in Bilbao (Bilbao Football Club) was already "taken" (founded at the end of 1900), so the name they chose was Athletic Club, using the English spelling. After obtaining the permission of the Civil Government, the Club was officially established on 5 September 1901, in the infamous meeting held at Café García, in which the 33 members, including Astorquia and his brother, Luis, signed the documents to make it official and register as a sports organization with the local council.

First games and first goals
At the end of 1901, the two most important clubs in the city were Athletic Club and the aforementioned Bilbao Football Club, so naturally, a rivalry soon arose between them, playing several friendlies at the Hippodrome of Lamiako, which the two teams shared since there were hardly any fields in Bilbao. Astorquia was one of the most important figures in this rivalry, which is historic not only because it is widely regarded as the very first club rivalry in Spain, but also because it served as one of the drivers of football as a mass phenomenon in Bilbao since their duels aroused great expectation. Astorquia stood out as a great goal scorer, netting three goals in three matches, including the opening goal in a 1–1 draw on 1 December 1901, and then, after missing a match on 15 December due to constipation; and without him his side lost for the first time (0–2); he netted a brace on 19 January 1902 to help his side to a 4–2 win, which not only marked Athletic's first victory over Bilbao FC in four matches, but also the first time that a paid match was held in Biscay, since they charged a ticket price of 30 cents of a peseta.

Club Bizcaya
In 1902, Juan Astorquia becomes the club's second president, taking over from Luis Márquez, who had been elected on 11 June 1901. Under Astorquia's presidency, the two rivals agreed to join the best players of each club to play two games against the Bordeaux-based side Burdigala. This temporary merge became known as Club Bizcaya, and Astorquia was the only Spanish player in Bizcaya's attacking quintet, with Bilbao FC's English forwards (Langford, Dyer, Butwell and Evans) making out the rest. He played in the first-ever line-up of the Bizcaya team against Burdigala on 9 March, helping his side to a 0–2 win in France, the first time a Bilbao team played on foreign territory, and three weeks later, on 31 March 1902, he was again in Bizcaya's starting XI for the return fixture at home, the first visit by a foreign team to Bilbao. Lamiako had its record attendance on that day and Astorquia rose to the occasion with a hat-trick to help his side to a 7–0 win over the French side.

Copa de la Coronacion
Together with Alejandro de la Sota, Armand Cazeaux, Dyer and Evans, he was part of the Bizcaya team that participated in the 1902 Copa de la Coronacion, the first national championship disputed in Spain and the forerunner for the Copa del Rey. Astorquia captained his team in the tournament and he led by example, netting three goals, one in each game he played: the quarter-finals against Club Español, in which he scored the opening goal in a 5–1 win and thus, the club's first competitive goal; in the semi-finals against New Foot-Ball Club and again the opener of the final in a 2–1 win over Joan Gamper's FC Barcelona, thus contributing decisively in Athletic's very first piece of silverware.

Copa del Rey triumphs
Astorquia used Bizcaya's successful campaign at the Copa de la Coronación to convince Luis Arana of how beneficial and necessary it was to merge the two clubs. Furthermore, the owners of Bilbao FC began to lose interest so, on 24 March 1903, Bilbao FC and its associates were officially and definitively absorbed by Athletic Club, and the side that emerged from the unification was called Athletic Club de Bilbao.

Still under Astorquia's presidency and captaincy, and together with Alejandro de la Sota, Armand Cazeaux and Walter Evans, the newly created Athletic team won the first-ever Copa del Rey in 1903, in which he also contributed decisively, netting a brace in the semi-finals against Espanyol (4–0), and in the final, Athletic found themselves 2–0 down to Madrid FC at half-time, but after a crucial harangue by Astorquia at the break, Athletic managed to pull off a comeback and win the title with a 3–2 victory. He was also part of the team that won the 1904 Copa del Rey, which Athletic won without playing a single match since their opponents failed to turn up.

Between 1902 and 1904, he played five competitive matches, in which he scored five goals (Athletic Bilbao counts the matches played by Bizcaya as its own).

Death
Juan Astorquia died on 23 October 1905 at the age of just 29, and like Pichichi, who also died in his youth, both became legends of Basque football. Athletic has its registered office at Calle Nueva, on the first floor, above the Donostiarra café.

Honours
Copa de la Coronación: 1902

Copa del Rey 1903, 1904

Notes

References

1876 births
1905 deaths
Spanish footballers
Athletic Bilbao footballers
Athletic Bilbao presidents
Association football forwards
Footballers from Bilbao